On 23 September 2022 a car bomb exploded outside a mosque in the Wazir Akbar Khan neighbourhood of Kabul, Afghanistan. The explosion happened as worshippers were leaving the building after finishing Friday prayers. Police said that seven people had been killed and 41 injured.

No group took responsibility. The bombing was condemned by the United States, the United Nations Assistance Mission in Afghanistan, and the European Union. Taliban authorities said that an investigation into the attack was ongoing.

References

2022 in Kabul
2020s crimes in Kabul
21st-century mass murder in Afghanistan
Car and truck bombings in Afghanistan
Car and truck bombings in the 2020s
Improvised explosive device bombings in Kabul
Mass murder in 2022
Mass murder in Kabul
Mosque bombings in Asia
September 2022 crimes in Asia
September 2022 events in Afghanistan
Terrorist incidents in Afghanistan in 2022